Abel is an unincorporated community in Cleburne County, in the U.S. state of Alabama.

History
A post office was established at Abel in 1889, and remained in operation until it was discontinued in 1907. The community was named after the biblical Abel, the second son of Adam and Eve.

Demographics
According to the census returns from 1850-2010 for Alabama, it has never reported a population figure separately on the U.S. Census.

References

Unincorporated communities in Cleburne County, Alabama
Unincorporated communities in Alabama